CMD Distribution is a faith and family film distribution company, headquartered in Wake Forest, North Carolina. The company distributes, acquires and markets Christian and family-friendly films.

CMD Distribution has distributed films such as Creed of Gold and Two for the Show, known for starring Mickey Rooney and being the last film in which Joe Dimaggio appeared.

Lawsuit
Crystal Creek Media launched a lawsuit against CMD Distribution for failing to fulfill its contractual financial obligations over the distribution of the movie Creed of Gold. In early 2017 Crystal Creek Media was awarded a judgment against CMD Distribution by the Superior Court of New Hanover County in the state of North Carolina.

Unfortunately, CMD was in the process of filing bankruptcy at the time due to the collapse of its biggest customer Allegro Media. Crystal Creek was told this but proceeded anyway with this lawsuit. Crystal Creek was paid prior to this filling all royalties due them but they still proceeded. This was the second major customer to declare bankruptcy impacting CMD beyond what it could withstand. CMD withdrew its distribution rights and could not continue to pay annual distribution license fees as it was in a bankruptcy situation.

Films 
Another Chance
Creed of Gold
Doonby
Gibsonburg
A Horse Called Bear
Like a Country Song
A Long Way Off
Never Alone
Quigley
Two for the Show
Unwanted Presence
War Flowers

References

External links 
 

Film distributors of the United States
Entertainment companies of the United States
Companies based in North Carolina